"Back to square one" is a phrase that means "to go back to the beginning, after a dead-end or failure".

It may also refer to:
 Square One (puzzle), also called "Back to Square One"
  Back to Square One (film), a 1994 German film

See also 
 Square One (disambiguation)

English phrases